Kelston is a village in the United Kingdom. It may also refer to:
Relating to the UK village:
Kelston Lock, a lock on the River Avon
Kelston railway station, a former railway station
Kelston Park, a listed house and its gardens
Kelston, New Zealand, a suburb of Auckland
Kelston Boys' High School, a school in the Auckland suburb
Kelston Girls' College, a school in the Auckland suburb
Kelston Deaf Education Centre, a residential special school in the Auckland suburb
Kelston (New Zealand electorate), a parliamentary electorate
Lucy Kelston (born 1922), American operatic soprano